Hans Poelzig (30 April 1869 – 14 June 1936) was a German architect, painter and set designer.

Life
Poelzig was born in Berlin in 1869 to Countess Clara Henrietta Maria Poelzig while she was married to George Acland Ames, an Englishman. Uncertain of his paternity, Ames refused to acknowledge Hans as his son and consequently he was brought up by a local choirmaster and his wife. In 1899 he married Maria Voss with whom he had four children.

His mother was the daughter of Alexander von Hanstein, Count of Pölzig and Beiersdorf who married Princess Louise of Saxe-Gotha-Altenburg in 1826. Because of this, Clara was the step-sister to Albert, Prince Consort making Hans a step-cousin to Albert's children.

Education
In 1903 he became a teacher and director at the Breslau Academy of Art and Design (today in Wrocław, Poland). From 1920–1935 he taught at the Technical University of Berlin.

Career
After finishing his architectural education around the turn of the century, Poelzig designed many industrial buildings. He designed the  Upper Silesia Tower in Posen (today Poznań) for an industrial fair in 1911. It later became a water tower. He was appointed city architect of Dresden in 1916. He was an influential member of the Deutscher Werkbund.

Poelzig was also known for his distinctive 1919 interior redesign of the Berlin Grosses Schauspielhaus for Weimar impresario Max Reinhardt, and for his vast architectural set designs for the 1920 UFA film production of The Golem: How He Came Into the World. (Poelzig mentored Edgar Ulmer on that film; when Ulmer directed the 1934 film noir Universal Studios production of The Black Cat, he returned the favor by naming the architect-Satanic-high-priest villain character "Hjalmar Poelzig", played by Boris Karloff.)

With his Weimar architect contemporaries like Bruno Taut and Ernst May, Poelzig's work developed through Expressionism and the New Objectivity in the mid-1920s before arriving at a more conventional, economical style. In 1927 he was one of the exhibitors in the first International Style project, the Weissenhof Estate in Stuttgart. In the 1920s he ran the "Studio Poelzig" in partnership with his wife Marlene (Nee Moeschke) (1894–1985). Poelzig also designed the 1929 Broadcasting House in the Berlin suburb of Charlottenburg, a landmark of architecture, and Cold War and engineering history.

Poelzig's single best-known building is the enormous and legendary I.G. Farben Building, completed in 1931 as the administration building for IG Farben in Frankfurt am Main, now known as the Poelzig Building at Goethe University. In March 1945 the building was occupied by American Allied forces under Eisenhower, became his headquarters, and remained in American hands until 1995. Some of his designs that were never built included one for the Palace of the Soviets and one for the League of Nations headquarters at Geneva.

In 1933 Poelzig served as the interim director of the United State School for Fine and Applied Art, after the expulsion of founding director Bruno Paul by the National Socialists. 

In 1935 Poelzig received first prize for a theater and concert hall in Istanbul, Turkey, where he was also planning to teach. On November 30 that year, age 65, he retired from the Director of the Architecture Department of the Prussian Academy of Arts in Berlin. While preparing to move to Turkey, on 14 June 1936, Hans Poelzig died of a stroke. He was buried in the 

In 1937 his wife had to close her studio under pressure from the National Socialists.

Legacy
On 18 November 2015, Friedrichstadt-Palast Berlin inaugurated a memorial at Friedrichstraße 107 dedicated to the theatre's founders, Max Reinhardt, Hans Poelzig and Erik Charell.

Work

Buildings
 1901 Church spire, Wrocław
 1904 A Family house with garden pavilion for the arts and crafts exhibition
 1908 Dwelling houses, corner of Menzelstraße and Wölflstraße in Breslau, (now Sztabowa/Pocztowa, Wrocław)
 1908 Dwelling house, Hohenzollernstraße, Breslau (no longer standing)
 1907 –  1909: mixed commercial offices and retail, Hohenzollernstraße, Wrocław (no longer standing)
 1911 Sulphuric acid factory in Luboń
 1911 Grain silo and Roofed Marketplace in Luboń
 1911 Exhibition Hall and Tower in Poznań for an industrial fair (destroyed)
 1912 Department store in Junkernstrasse, Wroclaw (now ul. Ofiar Oświęcimskich)
 1913 Four Domes Pavilion, Wroclaw (now part of UNESCO World Heritage Site "Centennial Hall")
 1919 Grosses Schauspielhaus, in Berlin
 1920 Festival Theater for Salzburg
 1924 Office building, Hanover
 1927 Deli cinema, Wrocław (now demolished)
 1929 Haus des Rundfunks (Radio Station), Charlottenburg, Berlin
 1929 Kino Babylon, Mitte, Berlin 
 1931 I.G. Farben Building in Frankfurt

Projects
 Palace of the Soviets
 League of Nations
 1920 – Film sets for The Golem: How He Came into the World
 1921 – Friedrichstraße Station Skyscraper competition in Berlin
 1925 – Capitol, cinema, Berlin
 1926 – German Forum for Sport, Berlin

Citations

References
 Berkovich, Gary. Reclaiming a History. Jewish Architects in Imperial Russia and the USSR. Volume 2. Soviet Avant-garde: 1917–1933. Weimar und Rostock: Grunberg Verlag. 2021. С. 218. 

Hans Poelzig (2000):  Hans Poelzig in Breslau: Architektur und Kunst 1900–1916, Aschenbeck & Holstein,  (German edition)
Julius Posener, Kristin Feireiss (1992):  Hans Poelzig: Reflections on His Life and Work, The MIT Press,  
Kenneth Frampton (2007):  The Evolution of 20th Century Architecture: A Synoptic Account, Springer Vienna Architecture, 
Heike: Hambrock (2005): Hans und Marlene Poelzig. Bauen im Geist des Barock. Architekturphantasien, Theaterprojekte und moderner Festbau (1916–1926), Aschenbeck & Holstein Verlag, Berlin, (German edition)
Hanno-Walter Kruft (1996): History of Architectural Theory, Princeton Architectural Press,

External links

His works in library of TU Berlin
Industry buildings
Film production design sketches on the European Film Gateway

1869 births
1936 deaths
19th-century German architects
Expressionist architects
Modernist architects
Architecture educators
Artists from Berlin
People from the Province of Brandenburg
Academic staff of the Prussian Academy of Arts
Academic staff of the Technical University of Berlin